In Greek mythology, Hippodamas (Ancient Greek: Ἱπποδάμας, gen. ) may refer to the following characters:

 Hippodamas, son of the river-god Achelous and princess Perimede, daughter of King Aeolus of Thessaly. He was the brother of Orestes and father of Euryte, wife of Porthaon.
Hippodamas, father of Perimele. He pushed his daughter off a cliff when he discovered that she was having a love affair with Achelous.
 Hippodamas, a Trojan prince and son of King Priam of Troy. He was killed by Ajax the Great.
 Hippodamas, a Trojan soldier who was killed by Odysseus.
 Hippodamas, another Trojan, was killed by Achilles.

Notes

References 

 Dictys Cretensis, from The Trojan War. The Chronicles of Dictys of Crete and Dares the Phrygian translated by Richard McIlwaine Frazer, Jr. (1931-). Indiana University Press. 1966. Online version at the Topos Text Project.
 Hesiod, Catalogue of Women from Homeric Hymns, Epic Cycle, Homerica translated by Evelyn-White, H G. Loeb Classical Library Volume 57. London: William Heinemann, 1914. Online version at theio.com 
 Homer, The Iliad with an English Translation by A.T. Murray, Ph.D. in two volumes. Cambridge, MA., Harvard University Press; London, William Heinemann, Ltd. 1924. Online version at the Perseus Digital Library.
 Homer. Homeri Opera in five volumes. Oxford, Oxford University Press. 1920. Greek text available at the Perseus Digital Library.
 Hyginus, Fabulae from The Myths of Hyginus translated and edited by Mary Grant. University of Kansas Publications in Humanistic Studies. Online version at the Topos Text Project.
 Pseudo-Apollodorus, The Library with an English Translation by Sir James George Frazer, F.B.A., F.R.S. in 2 Volumes, Cambridge, MA, Harvard University Press; London, William Heinemann Ltd. 1921. Online version at the Perseus Digital Library. Greek text available from the same website.
 Publius Ovidius Naso, Metamorphoses translated by Brookes More (1859-1942). Boston, Cornhill Publishing Co. 1922. Online version at the Perseus Digital Library.
 Publius Ovidius Naso, Metamorphoses. Hugo Magnus. Gotha (Germany). Friedr. Andr. Perthes. 1892. Latin text available at the Perseus Digital Library.

Children of Achelous
Trojans
Children of Priam
Princes in Greek mythology
Women in Greek mythology
Aetolian characters in Greek mythology
Thessalian characters in Greek mythology
Aetolian mythology
Thessalian mythology